The 1951 Open Championship was held at the Lansdowne Club in London from 04-9 April. Hashim Khan won his first title defeating four times champion Mahmoud Karim in the final.

Seeds

Results

+ amateur
^ seeded

References

Men's British Open Squash Championships
Men's British Open Championship
Men's British Open Squash Championship
Men's British Open Squash Championship
Men's British Open Squash Championship
Squash competitions in London